Herpetogramma hipponalis is a moth in the family Crambidae. It was described by Francis Walker in 1859. It is found in Malaysia, China, the Keeling Islands, Guadalcanal, New Guinea and Australia, where it has been recorded from the Northern Territory and Queensland.

References

Moths described in 1859
Herpetogramma
Moths of Asia
Moths of Australia